Les Soloai is a New Zealand professional rugby league footballer who plays for the Seattle Seawolves of Major League Rugby (MLR).

Soloai also represented United States in the 2013 World Cup.

He previously played for the Utah Warriors in the MLR from 2018 to 2020.

Playing career
Born in New Zealand. Soloai has previously played for the Tweed Head Seagulls in the Intrust Super Cup. Featherstone Rover in the UK Championship and Hawaii Chiefs in the AMNRL.

He has also played American Football for the University of Hawaii and Basketball at BYUH.

His position is at prop. He is a USA international  He has previously held a scholarship with the Wests Tigers

In 2013, Soloai was named in the United States squad for the World Cup and played in their 22-18 win over France, win over Cook Islands, Wales and quarter final loss to Australia.

External links
Statistics at espn.com

References

1987 births
Living people
American rugby league players
Featherstone Rovers players
Hawaii Chiefs players
Rugby league props
Seattle Seawolves players
Tweed Heads Seagulls players
United States national rugby league team players
Utah Warriors players
American rugby union players
Rugby union flankers
Rugby union number eights